Tuo is a Chinese surname, and a given name in various cultures. 柁 is pronounced Tuó in Mandarin.

Notable people with the surname include:

庹 
 Tou Chung-hua (born 1962), Taiwanese actor
 Tuo Tong (庹通, born 1984), Chinese fencer
 Tuo Zhen (庹震, born 1959), Chinese government official

柁 
 Tuo Jiaxi (柁嘉熹, born 1991), Chinese Go player

Notable people with the given name include (characters differ):

 Deng Tuo (邓拓, 1912–1966), Chinese poet, intellectual and journalist
 Tuo Fozié, Ivorian military officer
 Hua Tuo (華佗, died 208), Chinese physician
 Zhao Tuo (趙佗, circa 230–137 BC), Han Chinese commanding general of the Qin Dynasty

References

Chinese-language surnames
Chinese given names
Multiple Chinese surnames